"I'll Never Stop" is a song by American boy band NSYNC. It was released through Jive Records as the second single from the international edition of their second studio album, No Strings Attached (2000) on May 30, 2000. The song was written by Max Martin, Alexander Kronlund, and the producer Kristian Lundin. "I'll Never Stop" topped the charts in El Salvador, and peaked at number 13 on the UK Singles Chart, and charted in the top 20 in Scotland, Sweden, and the Czech Republic. The song was later included on NSYNC's 2005 greatest hits album Greatest Hits, which was its first release in the United States.

Background and release
"I'll Never Stop" was recorded by NSYNC in Battery Studios on the weekend of July 17–18, 1999, during their break from the NSYNC in Concert tour in New York. The song was written by Max Martin, Alexander Kronlund, and the producer Kristian Lundin, who produced the song at Cheiron Studios in Sweden. "I'll Never Stop" was released worldwide on various airplay formats in May 2000, as stated on the May 20, 2000 issue of Music & Media. It was released as a CD and maxi single in Europe on May 30, 2000, and as a CD and cassette single in the United Kingdom on July 10, 2000. The song was included on the band's first greatest hits album titled Greatest Hits on October 25, 2005, which was the first release of the song in the United States.

"I'll Never Stop" was the biggest-selling cassette single in the United Kingdom between 2009–2011, several years after cassettes were replaced by other music formats. The song sold 24 copies in 2009, 13 copies in 2010, and 11 copies in 2011. Music Week suggested that a sole retailer continuously sold copies throughout the country.

Commercial performance
"I'll Never Stop" debuted at the number 13 peak on the UK Singles Chart dated July 16, 2000, where it remained for six weeks. On the Scottish Singles Chart dated July 16, 2000, the song bowed at the number 15 peak. In the Czech Republic, "I'll Never Stop" peaked at number 11 on the International Federation of the Phonographic Industry (IFPI) Czech Republic 1 – Radio Journal chart. On the Swedish Sverigetopplistan, the song debuted at number 29 on the chart dated June 22, 2000. It peaked at number 20 on the chart dated July 20, 2000, and remained for 10 weeks. In Germany, "I'll Never Stop" debuted on the Official German Charts at the number 23 peak on the chart dated June 19, 2000, and charted for nine weeks.

Music video
The music video for "I'll Never Stop" was released in several European territories on the week of May 27, 2000. The video features four members of an NSYNC fan club dancing to the song, while they watch superimposed footage of the band on various objects such as mirrors, laptops, and pages of scrapbook photos. The fan club consists of a green room with memorabilia, including the single cover of "Bye Bye Bye" pasted on the front door. The footage of NSYNC consists of a real life montage of the group participating in various photoshoots in Times Square, concert footage from the NSYNC 'N Concert pay-per-view, and rehearsals in a baseball park. As of July 2020, the video has over 12 million views on YouTube.

Track listing

UK CD single

UK cassette single

European CD single

European maxi single

Credits and personnel
Credits adapted from the back cover of "I'll Never Stop".

Recording
Produced by Kristian Lundin at Cheiron Studios, Stockholm, Sweden
Vocals recorded by Mike Tucker at Battery Studios, New York City

Personnel
 Kristian Lundin songwriter, producer
 Max Martin songwriter
 Alexander Kronlund songwriter
 Mike Tucker vocal recording engineer
 Chaz Harper mastering
 Chris Haggerty digital editing

Charts

Release history

References

2000 songs
2000 singles
NSYNC songs
Jive Records singles
Songs written by Max Martin
Songs written by Kristian Lundin
Songs written by Alexander Kronlund
Torch songs